Richti Wallisellen is a mixed-use development (residential, commercial, offices) on former industrial land situated between Wallisellen railway station and the 1970s-era Glattzentrum indoor shopping mall.

The master plan of the new complex was designed by architect Vittorio Magnago Lampugnani on a model of an Italian city center.

Richti Wallisellen is made of six five-storey high buildings and one 72-meter-high glass high-rise.

Four buildings are for residential purpose. The first two, already inhabited, host private apartments and are respectively designed by Vittorio Magnago Lampugnani (Konradhof) and SAM Architekten (Escherhof). The second two host apartments for rent, and are both designed by Diener & Diener.

The remaining two buildings are for offices.
The first office building hosts the new headquarter of Allianz Suisse from end 2013, and is designed by Wiel Arets Architects. This is a much discussed and highly technological complex, and is composed of 2 glass buildings connected by bridges.
The second office building will host the new headquarter of UPC Cablecom from end 2014, and is designed by Max Dudler Architekten.

The complex has several public gardens with recreational areas for kids and a small Japanese garden in the internal court of the Allianz low building. All gardens are for public use, and open to public.

The Richtiarkade is the main artery of the complex, and has Richtiplatz at its center.

Buildings

Richti Shopping
On the ground floor of the Richti Wallisellen - along the Richtiarkade - there are stores and services.

Most of the stores focus on food, services and fashion.

The main food court is at the center of the open-air complex on Richtiplatz.

Richtiplatz

It's the beating heart of Richti shopping.
Here is a fountain, public benches, and several food businesses.

Andulino is an Italian restaurant specializing on pizza and grill.

Nooch is an Asian restaurant, specializing on Chinese and Thai food. It also incorporates Negishi, which offers Japanese specialities.

Sahar is a high-end Indian restaurant.

Schokolato is a gourmet Italian BAR GELATERIA, specializing in coffee, ice-cream/gelato and small lunch.

Zapote is Mexican-Californian restaurant, specializing on salads and burritos.

References

External links 
 Richti Shopping Official web site
 Wiel Arets Project

Buildings and structures in the canton of Zürich
Shopping malls in Switzerland